Daxing Subdistrict is a subdistrict in Yuhong District, Shenyang, Liaoning, China. , it has 2 residential communities and 11 villages under its administration.

See also 
 List of township-level divisions of Liaoning

References 

Township-level divisions of Liaoning
Shenyang